2137 may refer to:
 year 2137 3rd millennium#22nd century
 2137 BC
 Internet memes about Pope John Paul II
 2137 (number)
 2137 Priscilla, minor planet
 UGC 2137, spiral galaxy at the western edge of the Perseus constellation
 Lectionary 2137
 Aeromist-Kharkiv Flight 2137, Iran aviation accident
 HR 2137
 GPS week number rollover#2137 occurrence